This is a list of flag bearers who have represented Japan at the Olympics.

Flag bearers carry the national flag of their country at the opening ceremony of the Olympic Games.

See also
Japan at the Olympics

References

Japan at the Olympics
Japan
Olympic flagbearers